Cercospora minuta is a fungal plant pathogen.

References

minuta
Fungal plant pathogens and diseases
Fungi described in 1876